21 #1 Hits: The Ultimate Collection is an album by Buck Owens and his Buckaroos, released in 2006. Released shortly after his death, it is a single-disc compilation containing all of Owens' number one chart hits.

Reception

In his Allmusic review, critic Stephen Thomas Erlewine wrote "...there is no other single-disc Buck CD that comes as close to offering as much of his best in one disc as 21 #1 Hits: The Ultimate Collection, and it's nice to finally have such a collection in his catalog after such a long wait."

Track listing
All songs by Buck Owens unless otherwise noted.
 "Act Naturally" (Voni Morrison, Johnny Russell) – 2:22
 "Love's Gonna Live Here" – 2:02
 "Streets of Bakersfield" [Dwight Yoakam & Buck Owens] (Homer Joy) – 2:49
 "I've Got a Tiger By the Tail" (Harlan Howard, Owens) – 2:15
 "My Heart Skips a Beat" – 2:27
 "Together Again" – 2:27
 "I Don't Care (Just as Long as You Love Me)" – 2:10
 "Before You Go" (Owens, Don Rich) – 2:11
 "Only You (Can Break My Heart)" –  2:21
 "Buckaroo" (Bob Morris) – 2:00
 "Waitin' in Your Welfare Line" (Owens, Rich, Nat Stuckey) – 2:19
 "Think of Me" (Estella Olson, Rich) – 2:17
 "Open Up Your Heart" – 2:29
 "Where Does the Good Times Go" – 2:20
 "Sam's Place" (Owens, Red Simpson) – 2:00
 "Your Tender Loving Care" – 2:46
 "How Long Will My Baby Be Gone" – 2:14
 "Who's Gonna Mow Your Grass" – 2:23
 "Tall Dark Stranger" – 3:00
 "Made in Japan" (Bob Morris, Faye Morris) – 2:42
 "Johnny B. Goode" (Chuck Berry) – 2:23

Personnel
Buck Owens – guitar, vocals, harmony vocals
Don Rich – guitar, fiddle, harmony vocals
Doyle Holly – guitar, bass, background vocals
Flaco Jiménez – accordion
The Jordanaires – background vocals
Pete Anderson – guitar
Albert "Al Bruno" Bruneau – guitar
James Burton – guitar
Willie Cantu – drums, tambourine
Mel King – drums
Doyle Curtsinger – bass
Jeff Donavan – drums
Skip Edwards – piano
Donald Frost – bass
Tom Brumley – pedal steel guitar
Jay Dee Maness – pedal steel guitar
Jay McDonald – pedal steel guitar
Bob Morris – bass
Kenny Pierce – bass
Ken Presley – drums
Taras Prodaniuk – bass
Don Reed – fiddle
Jelly Sanders – guitar
Jim Shaw – organ
Red Simpson – guitar
Mel Taylor – drums
Jerry Wiggins – drums
Dwight Yoakam – guitar, vocals
Production notes
Ken Nelson – producer
Pete Anderson – producer
Jim Shaw – executive producer
James Austin – project Supervisor
Dave Schultz – remastering
Mathieu Bitton – art direction, design
Patrick Mulligan – discographical annotation
Gary Peterson – discographical annotation
Rich Kienzle – liner notes
Sheryl Farber – editorial supervision
Alan Fletcher – project supervisor
Mimi Miraflor – project assistant
Steve Woolard – project assistant
Becky Wagner – project assistant

Chart performance

References

2006 greatest hits albums
Buck Owens albums
Rhino Records compilation albums
Compilation albums of number-one songs